Jeremiah Joseph Hurley (June 15, 1863 – September 17, 1950) was an American professional baseball player and government official.

Hurley was born in Boston, Massachusetts and enrolled at Boston University.  He spent a decade playing professional baseball after he graduated, before his second career as a government official.  His brief obituary in the New York Times  stated that during his baseball career Hurley "was at one time associated with Connie Mack of the Philadelphia Athletics and Clark Griffith of the Washington Senators."  The surviving historical records don't shed any light on the connection between Mack and Hurley, although the two men almost certainly would have known each other. However, records do show that Griffith was one of Hurley's teammates in 1889 with the Milwaukee Brewers of the Western Association.

After playing for at least seven minor-league teams, Hurley finally made it to the major leagues in 1889, when he played one early-season game for  the Boston Beaneaters of the National League. Hurley later went on to play for the Pittsburgh Burghers in the Players' League in 1890 and the Cincinnati Kelly's Killers of the American Association in 1891. The Cincinnati team disbanded in mid-season and Hurley opted to spend the remainder of the 1891 season with the California League. He played three more seasons of minor league ball in the South and Midwest before retiring after the 1894 season.

After his playing career, Hurley settled down in his native Boston, married his fellow Bostonian Grace Farren in 1899, and began working for the federal government in the immigration office at the Port of Boston. By 1910, he had risen to the rank of Deputy Commissioner of Immigration.   In 1915, Hurley was elected Exalted Ruler of the Boston Elks Lodge.  He ended his career working in Washington, DC for the U.S. Immigration Service.

He died in 1950 at the age of 87 at his home in Dorchester, Massachusetts, after what was described merely as a "long illness".

Sources

References

1863 births
1950 deaths
19th-century baseball players
Major League Baseball catchers
Boston Beaneaters players
Pittsburgh Burghers players
Cincinnati Kelly's Killers players
Minor league baseball managers
Boston Reserves players
Oswego Sweegs players
San Francisco Pioneers players
Milwaukee Brewers (minor league) players
Milwaukee Creams players
San Jose Dukes players
Oakland Colonels players
Toledo Black Pirates players
Savannah Electrics players
Savannah Rabbits players
Detroit Creams players
Quincy Ravens players
Boston University Terriers baseball players
Baseball players from Boston